Pierre Tallet (born in 1966) is a French Egyptologist, most famous for discovering the Diary of Merer. He served as President of the French Society of Egyptology from 2009 to 2017.

Publications 
Tallet has authored various books and academic papers involving the Great Pyramid of Giza. Below is a full list of his works, some of which he collaborated with other authors and have been translated from French to English. These publications are according to the National Library of France and the Library of Congress.

 2003, Egypt: All that we know and how we know it
 2003, The inscriptions of Ayn Soukhna
 2003, The Cooking of the Pharaohs
 2005, Sesostris III and the end of the XII th Dynasty
 2006, At the table of the Pharaohs, tastes of yesterday and recipes of today
 2009, The Red Sea on Pharaonic Times
 2011, Ayn Soukhna II . The metallurgical workshops of the Middle Kingdom
 2012, The mining area of South Sinai I
 2013, 12 queens of Egypt who changed the story
 2015, The mining area of South Sinai II
 2015, Between Nile and Seas. Navigation in ancient Egypt
 2016, Ayn Sukhna III . The shopping gallery complex
 2017, From Sinai to Sudan. Routes of an Egyptologist
 2017, The Red Sea Papyrus
 2018, The Pharaonic Mining Area of South Sinai III . Egyptian dynastic shipments at the end of the XX th Dynasty
 2022, The Red Sea Scrolls, How Ancient Papyri Reveal the Secrets of the Pyramids

Discovery of Merer's Diary 

Tallet and his team discovered the oldest Egyptian papyri known to man in 2013, under a set of caves. Tallet attempted to translate this text into English and he concluded that Merer and his large group had the job of transporting thousands of limestone blocks via ship across the River Nile. This discovery is particularly vital in the modern study of the Great Pyramid, especially as Merer was previously an unknown figure in the study of the Great Pyramid.

References 

Living people
1966 births
French Egyptologists
French archaeologists
Members of the Institut Français d'Archéologie Orientale